Mila Mason (born August 22, 1963) is an American country music artist. She made her debut in 1996 with her debut album That's Enough of That, which produced three hit singles on the Billboard Hot Country Singles & Tracks (now Country Airplay) charts, including its title track. It was followed by 1998's The Strong One, from which two more singles were released. Mason did not record another album until 2003's Stained Glass Window, on the independent Twinbeat label.

Biography
Mila Mason was born August 22, 1963 in Dawson Springs, Kentucky. Her mother, Diane, was a singer who performed in Las Vegas and toured Europe. When Mason was 17, she and her mother moved to Nashville, Tennessee, and it was there that Mason decided to pursue a career in songwriting. She took up a job as a demo singer before being discovered by record producer Blake Mevis in 1993. Mevis sent some of Mason's material to Bryan Switzer, then the vice president of Atlantic Records.

Music career
In 1996, Mason was signed to Atlantic Records, and her debut single "That's Enough of That" reached the Top 20 on the Billboard Hot Country Songs charts. An album of the same name followed, producing two more singles: a No. 21-peaking song of Canadian singer-songwriter Amanda Marshall's "Dark Horse", followed by "That's the Kinda Love (That I'm Talking About)" at No. 59.

Mason released her second album, The Strong One, in 1998. It produced a No. 31 in lead-off single "Closer to Heaven" and the title track at No. 57, while "This Heart" failed to chart. Dissatisfied with the direction her career had taken, she left Atlantic in 1998 and took time off to work on her songwriting. She co-wrote Mindy McCready's 2002 single "Maybe, Maybe Not".

In 2003 Mason signed to the independent Twinbeat Records label and recorded the album Stained Glass Window, which included her own version of "Maybe, Maybe Not." She also became one of the first songwriters signed to the Nashville division of the Brumley Music Group, an independent country music and gospel music publishing company.

In late 2010, Mason took a break from recording and touring to head up the Faverett Music Group on Music Row, Nashville. Faverett is home to writer/artists Shane Piaseki, Adam Fears, & Dan Schafer. The catalog also has songs by artists including Chris Gantry, Dennis Matkowsky, Josh Osborne, Sheree Spann/Spoltore, Greg Barnhill, Jimmy Olander(Diamond Rio), Jim Collins, Randy Thomas.

Mason released a new single, "Run Like a Girl," produced by Tony Mantor, in February 2015.

Discography

Albums

Singles

Music videos

References

 

1963 births
Living people
People from Dawson Springs, Kentucky
American country singer-songwriters
American women country singers
Country musicians from Kentucky
Atlantic Records artists
Singer-songwriters from Kentucky
Kentucky women musicians
Singers from Kentucky
20th-century American singers
20th-century American women singers
21st-century American singers
21st-century American women singers